Ice Cream Man may refer to:

 A vendor employed on an ice cream van

Music
 Ice Cream Man (album), a 1996 album by Master P
"Mr. Ice Cream Man", the title track
 "Ice Cream Man", a song by Tom Waits from his 1973 album Closing Time
 "Ice Cream Man", a song by Jonathan Richman and the Modern Lovers from their 1977 album Rock 'n' Roll with the Modern Lovers
 "Ice Cream Man", a song by John Brim, also covered by Van Halen
 "Ice Cream Man", a song by Dru Down from his 1994 album Explicit Game
 "Ice Cream Man", a song by Blur from their 2015 album The Magic Whip
 "Ice Cream Man", a song by Yungblud from his 2020 album Weird!
 "Ice Cream Man", a 2018 song by Sam and the Womp

Other uses
 Ice Cream Man (business), an American business that gives away ice cream at music events
 Ice Cream Man (film), a 1995 American horror film about an ice cream man
 Ice Cream Man (comics), a comic book series written by W. Maxwell Prince